Lake Constance is a major European lake between Germany, Switzerland, and Austria. 

Lake Constannce or Constance Lake may also refer to:

Lake Constance (New Zealand), a lake on South Island
Jezioro Bodenskie (Lake of Constance), a 1986 Polish film directed by Janusz Zaorski

Ontario, Canada
Constance Lake (Algoma District), a lake of Ontario
Constance Lake (Cochrane District), a lake of Ontario
Constance Lake (Ottawa); see Geography of Ottawa
Constance Lake (Timiskaming District), a lake of Ontario
Constance Lake First Nation, an Oji-Cree First Nation in northeastern Ontario, Canada
Constance Lake 92, a reserve of the Constance Lake First Nation

United States
Constance Lake, a lake in Wright County, Minnesota; see List of lakes of Minnesota

See also
 
 
Constance (disambiguation)